is one of the original 40 throws of Judo as developed by Kano Jigoro.  It belongs to the second group of the traditional throwing list in the Gokyo no waza of the Kodokan Judo. It is also part of the current 67 Throws of Kodokan Judo, and classified as a hip technique (koshiwaza). Harai goshi is also one of the 20 techniques in Danzan ryu's Nagete list as well as one of the 18 throws in the Kar-do-Jitsu-Ryu martial arts system. English terms include "Sweeping hip throw" and "Hip Sweep".

See also
 Judo technique
 The Canon Of Judo

References

Further reading

External links
 Graphic 
 Judo
 Danzan Ryu
 Demonstrated 
 Tournament

Judo technique
Throw (grappling)
Grappling hold
Grappling positions
Martial art techniques